"Follow Me Around" is a song by the English rock band Radiohead, released on 1 November 2021 as the second single from their compilation album Kid A Mnesia. It was recorded during the joint sessions for Radiohead's fourth and fifth studio albums, Kid A (2000) and Amnesiac (2001), but went unreleased until 2021.

History
"Follow Me Around" first appeared in the 1998 documentary Meeting People is Easy. Rolling Stone described it as one of singer Thom Yorke's darkest songs, with lyrics about "shadowy figures lurking in corners". 

Yorke performed "Follow Me Around" occasionally in solo shows, with Radiohead, and with his side project Atoms for Peace. He and the Radiohead guitarist Jonny Greenwood performed a rearranged version in 2017. After a performance at a Radiohead show in Toronto in 2000, fans created a website demanding the song's release.  

"Follow Me Around" was included on the 2021 compilation album Kid A Mnesia and released on 1 November, 2021, as the second single. The day before the release, Radiohead uploaded a full-quality clip of the soundcheck performance from Meeting People is Easy to their YouTube channel.

Music video
On 1 November 2021, coinciding with the initial release of the song, Radiohead released a music video featuring the actor Guy Pearce being chased by a drone camera. The video was directed by Us, a directing duo consisting of Chris Barrett and Luke Taylor. Pearce said the video was recorded a few weeks before the release.

Reception
In The A.V. Club, Alex McLevy wrote that "Follow Me Around" was "maybe the simplest, purest pop song [Radiohead have] ever put out". Several publications celebrated the release as a long-awaited fan favourite, including Rolling Stone, The Fader, Spin, Uproxx and NME.

Personnel

Radiohead
Colin Greenwood 
Jonny Greenwood 
Ed O'Brien 
Philip Selway
Thom Yorke

Additional personnel 
 Nigel Godrich production, engineering, mixing
 Gerard Navarro production assistance, additional engineering
 Graeme Stewart additional engineering

References

2021 songs
Radiohead songs
Song recordings produced by Nigel Godrich
Songs written by Thom Yorke
Songs written by Jonny Greenwood
Songs written by Colin Greenwood
Songs written by Ed O'Brien
Songs written by Philip Selway
XL Recordings singles